Balut may refer to:

 Balut, Côte-d'Or, a commune in Bourgogne-Franche-Comté, France
 Balut (comedian) (1926–1996), Filipino comedian
 Balut (food), a boiled fertilized egg, popular in parts of Asia 
 Balot Doctora (born 1986), Filipino footballer
 Kevin Balot, Filipino who won Miss International Queen in 2012

See also
 Balut (disambiguation)